Elizabeth Margaret von Gerkan is an American actress.

Early life
Hughes' uncle, F. Hugh Herbert, was a playwright who authored Kiss and Tell and The Moon Is Blue. Her desire to act was inspired by a film she saw featuring Donald O'Connor, which gave her the idea that "acting looked like fun." After graduating from Fairfax High School, Hughes attended Los Angeles City College and UCLA.

Motion pictures
Hughes was discovered in a Little Theater production in 1948. Signed to a seven-year contract with 20th Century Fox, she made 14 films for the studio. She appeared in five motion pictures for Universal Studios, including the cult film It Came From Outer Space. Hughes co-starred with Edward G. Robinson in a 1953 crime drama, The Glass Web, and opposite Rock Hudson in an adventure film that year, The Golden Blade.

Television
By 1956, Hughes was appearing in television series. She played in episodes of Alfred Hitchcock Presents (1956–1957), Telephone Time (1956), The Bob Cummings Show (1958), The Adventures of Ozzie and Harriet, 77 Sunset Strip (1959), Hotel de Paree (1959), Tightrope! (1959), General Electric Theater (1960–1962), The Tall Man (1961), Bachelor Father (1962), Gomer Pyle, U.S.M.C. (1965), and I Dream of Jeannie (1967).

In 1962, Hughes played the role of murder victim Lita Krail in the sixth-season 1962 episode of  Perry Mason, entitled "The Case of the Double-Entry Mind". She played the recurring role of Mrs. Coburn on the television series The Ghost & Mrs. Muir.  She appeared on M*A*S*H as Lorraine Blake, wife of unit commander Henry Blake, in a home movie she sent to him. Hughes portrayed Mitch, a secretary, on the NBC drama Bracken's World (1969–1971).

Stage
Hughes' favorite stage role was in the play The Seven Year Itch.

Personal life
On July 25, 1954, Hughes married Stanley Rubin, the producer of Bracken's World, at the home of her uncle. The couple had one daughter and three sons. The marriage lasted 59 years, until Rubin died on March 2, 2014, from natural causes at the age of 96.

Filmography

References

Sources

External links

 
 
 

Living people
American stage actresses
American film actresses
American television actresses
Actresses from Los Angeles
20th Century Studios contract players
Year of birth missing (living people)